Ohio's 10th senatorial district  has been based in south-central Ohio. It comprises the counties of Clark, Greene and Madison.  It encompasses Ohio House districts 73, 74 and 79.  It has a Cook PVI of R+7.  Its current Ohio Senator is Republican Bob Hackett.  He resides in Madison County.

List of senators

External links
Ohio's 10th district senator at the 130th Ohio General Assembly official website

Ohio State Senate districts